The 1992 Mazda Classic was a women's tennis tournament played on outdoor hard courts at the La Costa Resort and Spa in San Diego, California in the United States that was part of Tier III of the 1992 WTA Tour. It was the 14th edition of the tournament and was held from August 24 through August 30, 1992. Second-seeded Jennifer Capriati won the singles title and earned $45,000 first-prize money.

Finals

Singles
 Jennifer Capriati defeated  Conchita Martínez, 6–3, 6–2

Doubles
 Jana Novotná /  Larisa Savchenko-Neiland defeated  Conchita Martínez /  Mercedes Paz, 6–1, 6–4

References

External links
 ITF tournament edition details
 Tournament draws

Mazda Classic
Southern California Open
Toshiba Classic
1992 in American tennis